Ivanauskiella is a genus of moths in the family Gelechiidae.

Species
Ivanauskiella psamathias (Meyrick, 1895)

References

Anomologini